Shirley Gordon Olafsson (born Shirley Gordon; 10 April 1927 – 23 November 2019) was a Canadian athlete. She competed in the women's high jump at the 1948 Summer Olympics tying for 11th place.

Gordon was born with a deformed left foot. She walked with a limp and used crutches until she was 13. Unable to compete in team sports, she taught herself the high jump. She joined a track club after a friend who was invited insisted that they admit Shirley as well. She married Herbert Olafsson, who was a member of the Canadian National Basketball team.

References

External links
 
  on the BC Sports Hall of Fame

1927 births
2019 deaths
Athletes (track and field) at the 1948 Summer Olympics
Canadian female high jumpers
Olympic track and field athletes of Canada
Athletes (track and field) at the 1950 British Empire Games
Commonwealth Games competitors for Canada
Athletes from Vancouver